The Karabakh horse is a mountain-steppe racing and riding horse breed. It is named after the Karabakh region, from which the breed originates.

The Karabakh is thought to be influenced by Persian horses and the Akhal-Teke, Kabarda, Turkoman and Arabian breeds, and it influenced the development of the Russian Don during the 19th century. It is bred primarily in Azerbaijan's Shaki region. The breed numbers below 1,000, and it is threatened with extinction.

History 

The Karabakh region was known for the quality of its horses; the classical historian Strabo describes the Armenian province of “Orchistene" as supplying the kingdom with the "most cavalry." According to some sources, tens of thousands of horses with golden-chestnut coloring (characteristic of Karabakhs) were seized by the Arabs during their eighth- and ninth-century conquest of Arran.

The Karabakh has close links to the Akhal-Teke (which is bred in Turkmenistan) and the Turkoman horse, which is bred in Iran. Some historians believe that they were originally a single breed and significantly influenced the development of the Arabian horse. These facts were found out after numerous studies in the 19th century.

The breed acquired its present characteristics during the 18th and 19th centuries. In Transcaucasia, Karabakh Khanate was known as a place for breeding of horses. Factory of the khanate was the main farm of purebred horses, which were not held for sale, but were only presented as gifts. According to Diterikhs, in 1797, right after the death of Agha Mohammad , Ibragim khan got his stable. There is some evidence that Ibrahim-Khalil (1763–1806), ruler of the Karabakh Khanate, had a herd numbering 3,000–4,000 (primarily Karabakhs). During the 19th century, Karabakhs became popular in Europe. An English company purchased 60 Karabakh mares from Mehdigulu Khan Javanshir, the last ruler of the Karabakh Khanate, at a large 1823 sale. Although its numbers were impacted in 1826 during the Russo-Iranian war, the breed remained intact.

The Karabakh played a significant role in the formation of the Russian Don breed. The heir of Russian general Valerian Madatov sold all his horses, including 200 Karabakh mares, to a breeder in the Don region in 1836. The mares were used to improve the Russian Don into the 20th century.

Karabakh numbers sharply decreased again during the early 20th century, primarily because of civil and ethnic wars in the Caucasus in general and the Karabakh region in particular. The breeding enterprise established by the Karabakh khans and developed by their heirs was destroyed in 1905. Karabakhs were bred to other breeds, resulting in changes including a reduction in size.

In 1949, the breed was revived at the Agdam stud in Azerbaijan. Seven years later, the Karabakh stallion Zaman and an Akhal-Teke named Mele-Kush were presented to Queen Elizabeth II by the Soviet government.

The breed experienced another setback during the First Nagorno-Karabakh War. Before the 1993 capture of Agdam by Armenian forces, most of the Karabakh horses were moved from the Agdam stud. They are currently bred in winter pastures on the lowland Karabakh plains between Barda and Agjabadi.

During the years of Russian Empire 

In 1805 Karabakh became part of Russia. Mehdigulu Khan, who ruled after Ibragim Khan, was not interested in the development of stud farms. As a consequence the quantity of khan horses was decreasing. In 1822, Mehdigulu Khan ran away to Persia, and his best horses were presented as gifts to his close people. Unlike Mehdigulu Khan, his daughter Khurshidbanu Natavan was actively engaged in the development of stud farms. Natavan's Karabakh horses took part in the Exposition Universelle (1867), agricultural exhibition in Moscow (1869), in Tbilisi (1882) and were awarded golden medals and certificates of honour. Karabakh horses were also awarded at the Second All-Russian Exhibition in 1869: Meymun – silver medal, Tokmak – bronze medal. At the Exposition Universelle (1867) in Paris, Khan got a silver medal.

According to modern Azerbaijani sources, not only Khan's daughter, but also many Karabakh bays owned stud farms. Among them were Ugurlu Bay, Jafargulu Khan, Rustam Bay Behbudov, Kerim-aga Javanshir, Shamil bay and others. Overall in the middle of the 19th century, there were 11 stud farms, with 250 stallions and 1450 fillies.

Karabakh horses were used by Russian officers who served in the Caucasus. Russian poet Aleksandr Pushkin, who traveled to Arzurum in 1829, wrote in his travel notes that young Russian officers were riding Azerbaijani horses. On 21 May 1843, the coat of arms of Shusha was approved and Karabkh horse was depicted on it.

In the Soviet Union 
In 1948, the Soviets began a breeding program which included the use of nine Arabian stallions, as no pure Karabakh stallions were available at the time.

During the years of Azerbaijan Republic 
Karabakh horses are breed at two stud farms: in the village of Lambaran of Barda region and in Agstafa. Private stud farms exist in line with state enterprises. Because of First Nagorno-Karabakh War, the number of horses significantly decreased. This happened because horses were often moved from one place to another and pregnant fillies experienced misbirths. Moreover, horses were breed in unsatisfactory conditions.

In 2013, Chovqan, a traditional Karabakh horse riding game in the Republic of Azerbaijan was mentioned in the UNESCO Intangible Cultural Heritage Lists. As of 2015, the Azerbaijani Ministry of Agriculture the export of Karabakh horses is banned and the Ministry focuses on the breeding of the small amount of still existing Karabakh horses.

On 13 February 2017, Organisational Committee of Islamic Solidarity Games introduced mascots: Karabakh horses Inca, that represented beauty and tenderness and Casur, that stood out with self-confidence and love of freedom.

Modern times 

The Karabakh horse is the national animal of Azerbaijan and the official symbol of the Agdam and Shaki districts. The horse, of great cultural importance to the people of Azerbaijan, appears in literature and on postage stamps. Qarabağ FK's logo contains two rearing horses, based on the Karabakh horse.

According to Kurban Said's novel Ali and Nino, "I looked at the horse and was struck numb. There stood the red-golden miracle of Karabakh ... one of the twelve golden horses in the whole world ..." A horse in Karabakh is described in Mikhail Lermontov's poem, "Demon".

In 2012, the breed appeared at the Royal Windsor Horse Show to perform at the Diamond Jubilee of Elizabeth II. A monument to the Karabakh horse was unveiled in Belgium in March 2017, and the Karabakh was the mascot of the 2017 Islamic Solidarity Games.

On May 16, 2022, Queen Elizabeth II was presented with a Karabakh horse named Shohrat (Glory) as gift from President Ilham Aliyev of Azerbaijan.

Characteristics
It has a small, well-defined head, a straight profile with a broad forehead, and large nostrils. The neck is set high, average in length, muscular and elegant. It has a compact body, with well-defined and well-developed muscles. The shoulder is often upright. The horse has a deep chest, a sloping croup and long, fine, strong legs with small joints. Its chest is narrow and it is not very deep through the girth, due to the Akhal-Teke influence.

The skin is thin and soft, with a shiny coat. The main colors are chestnut and bay, with a characteristic golden tint; some are gray, and palominos and buckskins are rare. White markings are permitted. As well as being fast and agile, the Karabakh is known for its endurance and loyalty.

They are known for their endurance as the 19th century French Geographer Reclus Elisée describes in his book L'Homme et la terre (The Earth and its Inhabitants)  their strength as: "The Karabakh horses, however, which climb the cliffs like goats, are said to be the finest in Transcaucasia"

See also 
 Azerbaijan horse

References

Horse breeds
Karabakh
Horse breeds originating in Azerbaijan
National symbols of Azerbaijan